Euphaedra rex is a butterfly in the family Nymphalidae. It is found in Uganda and Kenya.

References

Butterflies described in 1935
rex